Thore Michelsen (10 May 1888 – 17 May 1980) was a Norwegian rower who competed in the 1920 Summer Olympics.

In 1920 he won the bronze medal as crew member of the Norwegian boat in the men's eight competition.

References

External links
profile

1888 births
1980 deaths
Norwegian male rowers
Olympic rowers of Norway
Rowers at the 1920 Summer Olympics
Olympic bronze medalists for Norway
Olympic medalists in rowing
Medalists at the 1920 Summer Olympics